The 2022–23 season is FC Ararat Yerevan's 32nd consecutive season in Armenian Premier League, where they will also compete in the Armenian Cup.

Season events
On 17 January, Serob Galstyan extended his contract with Ararat Yerevan until the summer of 2025.

On 4 February, Ararat Yerevan announced the signing of Mohamed Kone from Stade Lausanne Ouchy.

On 7 February, Ararat Yerevan announced the signing of Ibeh Ransom from Hapoel Nir Ramat HaSharon.

On 11 February, Christian Ouguehi was sold to Inter Turku.

On 16 February, Ararat Yerevan announced the signing of Kassim Hadji from Stade Nyonnais and Georgi Babaliev from Spartak Varna.

The following day, 17 February, Ararat Yerevan announced the signing of Dušan Mijić from Mladost Novi Sad, and the return of Sergei Revyakin who'd previously left Alashkert.

On 18 February, Ararat Yerevan announced the signings of Petros Afajanyan, Erik Azizyan and Aleksandr Ter-Tovmasyan.

On 6 March, Ararat Yerevan announced the signings of Ayman Mahmoud from Olympique Béja and free agent Teddy Mézague.

Squad

Transfers

In

Out

Released

Friendlies

Competitions

Overall record

Premier League

Results summary

Results by round

Results

Table

Armenian Cup

UEFA Europa Conference League

Qualifying rounds

Statistics

Appearances and goals

|-
|colspan="16"|Players away on loan:
|-
|colspan="16"|Players who left Ararat Yerevan during the season:

|}

Goal scorers

Clean sheets

Disciplinary record

References

FC Ararat Yerevan seasons
Ararat Yerevan
Ararat Yerevan